Tomas Kaukėnas (born 1 May 1990) is a Lithuanian biathlete. He competes at the Biathlon World Cup. Kaukėnas best result in the World Championships is 22nd place in sprint event in 2013.

In 2014 Kaukėnas was selected to represent Lithuania in 2014 Winter Olympic Games.

Biathlon results
All results are sourced from the International Biathlon Union.

World Championships
0 medals

*During Olympic seasons competitions are only held for those events not included in the Olympic program.
**The single mixed relay was added as an event in 2019.

References

1990 births
Living people
Lithuanian male biathletes
Biathletes at the 2014 Winter Olympics
Biathletes at the 2018 Winter Olympics
Biathletes at the 2022 Winter Olympics
Olympic biathletes of Lithuania
People from Ignalina